JML  may refer to:
 Java Modeling Language, a specification language for Java programs
 Journal of Memory and Language, abbreviated JML
 "Joiner, mover, leaver", a collection of business processes managing access to an organisation's systems within an identity lifecycle
 JML (John Mills Limited), a UK consumer brand
 JML Direct TV, a series of British television shopping channels owned by John Mills Limited
 South African Jewish Maritime League